The Livingston Educational Service Agency (LESD) is an intermediate school district in Michigan, headquartered in Howell.

Most of Livingston County is served by the Livingston Educational Service Agency, which coordinates the efforts of local boards of education, but has no operating authority over schools. Local school boards in Michigan retain great autonomy over day-to-day operations.

History
The district was formed in 1962 when the Michigan Legislature created intermediate school districts in each county in the state. The district was originally known as the Livingston Intermediate School District, and was renamed in 1990 to better reflect the services provided by the agency.

Composition
The Livingston Educational Service Agency supports many public school districts, private schools, charter schools, colleges, and facilities.
Livingston Educational Service Agency administrates all Special Education programs in the county. Livingston Educational Service Agency
administrates School Bus Transportation in Livingston County (excepting in the Fowlerville School District) via the Regional Transportation
Collaborative (RTC).

Governance
The Livingston Educational Service Agency is governed by a publicly elected board of education, who is responsible for hiring a superintendent to serve as the chief administrative officer of the agency.

Public school districts
As of the 2017–2018 school year, these are the school districts in Livingston County, Michigan. Livingston Education Service Agency supports these school districts.:
 Brighton Area Schools
 Fowlerville Community Schools
 Hartland Consolidated Schools
 Howell Public Schools
 Pinckney Community Schools

Private schools
The Livingston Educational Service Agency includes several private schools, such as Shepherd of the Lakes Lutheran School.

Charter schools
The Livingston Educational Service Agency includes charter schools, such as the Kensington Woods High School.

Colleges
The Livingston Educational Service Agency includes these colleges:
 Cleary University (Howell Campus)
 Eastern Michigan University
 Ferris State University
 Lansing Community College
 Madonna University
 Mott Community College
 Washtenaw Community College

Agencies and facilities
The Livingston Educational Service Agency includes agencies and facilities such as the Pathway School which supports Special Education.

See also
 List of intermediate school districts in Michigan

References

Education in Livingston County, Michigan
Intermediate school districts in Michigan